Operation Osoaviakhim
was a secret Soviet operation under which more than 2,500 former Nazi German specialists
(i.e. scientists, engineers and technicians who worked in specialist areas)
from companies and institutions relevant to military and economic policy in the
Soviet occupation zone of Germany (SBZ) and the Soviet sector of Berlin, as well as around 4,000 more family members, totalling more than 6,000 people, were transported from former Nazi Germany as war reparations in the Soviet Union. It took place in the early morning hours of October 22, 1946
when MVD (previously NKVD) and Soviet Army units
under the direction of the Soviet Military Administration in Germany (SMAD),
headed by Ivan Serov.

Much related equipment was also moved, the aim being to literally transplant research and production research centers
such as the relocated V-2 rocket center of Mittelwerk, from Germany to the Soviet Union,
and collect as much material as possible from test centers such as the Luftwaffe's central military aviation test
center at Erprobungstelle Rechlin, taken by the Red Army on 2 May 1945.

The codename Osoaviakhim is the acronym of the then large Soviet organization OSOAVIAKhIM, which recruited civilians for the Red Army during World War II (and later renamed to DOSAAF)
which was mistakenly used for the first time on October 23, 1946, by the broadcaster  (DENA) of the US
occupying power and adapted by the Central Intelligence Group (CIG), a predecessor of the CIA, as Operation Ossavakim.
Another predecessor organization of the CIA, the Office of Strategic Services (OSS) used the term Operation
Ossavakim for the first time on January 13, 1947.

The Osoaviakhim campaign served to secure the transfer of know-how and is described in Russia as "Foreign Experts in the USSR". In some cases, the families of those affected and their furniture were also relocated. The years in the Soviet Union passed without employment contracts and legitimization through personal documents.

The operation has parallels with other Allied operations such as Alsos Mission, Operation Paperclip and Russian Alsos, in which the Allies brought military specialists and scientists from Germany.

Background history 

At the end of World War II the Soviet Union had been devastated by Nazi Germany, with 27 million people killed, 1,700 cities destroyed and agriculture production reduced to famine proportions.
At the Yalta Conference Winston Churchill, Franklin D. Roosevelt, and Joseph Stalin agreed that war reparations were payable by Nazi Germany in the form of equipment, goods and German labour, with Roosevelt and Stalin agreeing to an amount of $20 Billion, with 50% ($10 Billion) going to the Soviet Union. The Soviets, United States and to a lesser extent British and France all seized "intellectual"  repatriations from Germany. The dismantling of German industry also ensured the complete disarmanent of its war potential, as agreed at the Potsdam Conference.

A race between the Allies developed to acquire as many scientists and engineers as possible, particularly nuclear physicists needed for the development of nuclear weapons, followed by Rocket Technology, such as the V2 Missile ('Retaliation Weapon 2') and the Messerschmitt Me 163 Komet. Expertise in Gyroscopic instrumentation for inertial guidance and modern advances
in airplane construction, such as Turbojet-engines or Swept wings were also sought.

Other fields of remarkable interest were, including but not limited to, miscellaneous
electronic devices, color film products, chemical weapons and optics.
Hiring or abduction of these skilled workers was one of the objectives of the so-called 'Trophy commissions'.

Immediately following the German Instrument of Surrender, skilled workers, documents,
laboratories and material were shipped abroad in the western zones of occupation.
Among these, the "abduction of German nuclear physicists to Farm Hall" as a part of Operation Epsilon
became particularly well known. In the Soviet occupation zone of Germany, the Soviet Union
initially set up a large number of design offices, e.g. the Nordhausen Institute
in the vicinity of Bleicherode and the Berlin Institute for the reconstruction of
German guided missiles.

The operation formally known as Operation Osoaviakhim was decreed on the 13. May 1946 under
resolution No. 1017-419 by the Council of Ministers of the Soviet Union with the objective to accomplish
"Transfer of the construction bureaus as well as 2 000 German specialists til end of 1946"

The People's Commissariat for Internal Affairs commissioned Ivan Serov, Head of the
Soviet Military Administration in Germany with the secret preparations. The Soviet Union
wanted to ensure full access to German technologies both through the transfer of expert
knowledge and the dismantling of the production facilities and their reconstruction in the 
Soviet Union. In addition, according to the Potsdam Agreement of August 2, 1945,
developing and manufacturing weapons in Germany was banned.
With the decree of the Council of Ministers of the Soviet Union No. 1539-686 of July 9, 1946,
Stalin laid October 22, 1946 as the start of the dismantling operations.

Operation Ossawakim was unprecedented in its dimensions: in a concerted, secret operation on
October 22, 1946, employees of facilities within the entire Soviet zone of occupation were drafted within half
a day and 92 freight trains were made available for transport. In detail, for example,
it was presented as follows: Days beforehand, Kurt Magnus noticed unusual bustle of the
Soviet military and the arrival of freight trains at the station in Bleicherode.
A specialist from Dessau managed to escape hours beforehand. He could not manage to warn
his colleagues by telephone; as the telephone network had been shut down.
Public transport in Dessau had been suspended as well. – A designer at Zeiss suffered a fatal heart attack when he was informed that he would be transported away.

In the first mention of Operation Ossawakim, a number of companies and facilities were named
which were confirmed and supplemented in the follow-up secret orders which are mentioned below.
However, so far, the known documents do not entirely match with reality.

In second half of this article, we will differentiate between:

 Facilities of the engine and aviation industry
 Optical technologies and glass industry (Jena)
 Other institutions (electrical industry, chemical industry, film chemistry, shipping, etc.)

Different institutions were responsible for the handling of respective sectors in Operation Osoaviakhim:
The Ministry of Aviation Industry of the USSR was responsible for the former:
These operations affected facilities throughout the Soviet Zone, and those affected commented on
their stay in the USSR (see also: biographies section).
The Ministry of Armaments of the USSR was responsible for the operations
concentrating on Jena, all of those affected remained silent later.

Course and consequences of the transportation 

In the night of 21st of October 1946, the day following the 1946 Soviet occupation zone state elections
as well as the 1946 Berlin state election until 22. October 1946, soviet officers
accompanied by a translator as well as an armed soldier stopped by the homes of German
specialists, ordering them to pack their belongings. Trucks and trains had been prepared and were standing
ready for the immediate transport of those affected and their families to a destination unknown to them.
Altogether it is assumed that around 6,500 people were brought to the Soviet Union, the majority of them
against their will.

 1 385 of these specialists had worked in the Ministry of Aviation developing planes as well as jet engines and Surface-to-air missiles,
 515 in the Ministry of Armaments, primary concerned with development of liquid rocket engines, 
 358 in the Ministry of Telecommunications Industry (Radar and Telemetry),
 81 in the Ministry of Chemical Industry,
 62 in the Ministry of Shipbuilding (gyro and navigation systems),
 27 in the Ministry of Agricultural Machinery (solid rocket engines),
 14 in the Ministry of Cinema and Photographic Industry,
 3 in the Ministry of Petroleum Industry and
 107 in establishments of the Ministry of Light Industry.

On October 22, the Berlin branch of the Social Democratic Party of Germany protested against the deportation.
On October 24, the Allied Control Council received a complaint from the British representative of the Allied Kommandatura,
along with the consent of the American and French Representatives, condemining the transfer of 400 Berlin specialists,
including residents of the British sector of Berlin, to the Soviet Union as a violation of valid labor laws
as well as violations of human rights. A discussion of the Allied Control Council about
this deportation was adjourned by its coordination committee on October 29 because of
"strong differences about the voluntary or involuntary character of the transports" between the Soviet and
the American and British representatives.

Inside the Soviet occupation zone of Germany and East Berlin all protests were silenced quickly
following a short uproar of the Free German Trade Union Federation. 

Both the German and Soviet factory management were surprised by this action.

Despite this, the affected specialists and their families were doing well compared
to citizens of the
Soviet Union and the Soviet Zone, apart from the suffering of deportation and isolation.
The specialists earned more than their Soviet counterparts.
The scientists, technicians and skilled workers were assigned to individual projects
and working groups, primarily in the areas of Aeronautics and rocket technology,
nuclear research, Chemistry and Optics. The stay was given for about five years.

In the following years, equipment from numerous high-tech companies, including those from Carl Zeiss (Jena),
Junkers (Dessau) and the Siebel works (Halle), were dismantled and shipped to the Soviet Union.
This was part of the reparations payments agreed upon in the Potsdam Agreement.
The above-mentioned deportation secured the specialists needed for operation and continuation for the
Soviet Union in advance. Their goals were to advance the expansion of the armaments industry,
as well as developing nuclear and rocket technology.

For strategic reasons, they also did not want to leave military research and development
in the SBZ, especially since the Potsdam Agreement provided for the demilitarization of Germany.

Historian Daniel Bohse describes it as follows:

Under threat of reprisals, specialists and their relatives were forbidden from handing
over, sending or taking written documents back home, such as construction documents and diaries.
Nevertheless, some specialists, including Baade and his colleagues did just that,
as literature of the development of the first German passenger jet aircraft, the Baade 152 shows.

After this period of intellectual quarantine had passed, the specialists returned to Germany between 1951
and 1958. Before leaving, they were taught to keep their years in the Soviet Union secret.
The specialists who returned to the GDR usually received generous offers for managerial positions,
their families were given preferential treatment by receiving generous living space. 

The industrial sectors affected by the operation are discussed in detail below.

Jet engine and aviation industry 

Initially, so-called experimental design offices (OKBs) were set up in the Soviet occupation zone of Germany, which were under Soviet-German management. By the middle of 1946, some of these had developed into extensive development companies, such as the central works (Zentralwerke) in Bleicherode which had several thousand employees. In this respect, the Control Council regulations on the restriction of German research were
handled extremely laxly by the SMAD up to the fall of 1946. Such institutions were transformed into Soviet joint-stock companies (SAGs).

The military strategic importance of these institutions led to conflicts with the Allied treaties which had been agreed upon in the Soviet Zone, which is why certain Soviet leadership considered transferring these institutions to their motherland. This decision was in turn rejected by an opposition in Soviet leadership on the grounds that competitors should not be brought into one's own country. Following these complications, Stalin decided to move specialist personnel and material to the Soviet Union on April 2, 1946.

Rocket designer Sergei Korolev was a technical adviser on the part of the Soviet Union with the rank of colonel, which had been seconded to the Zentralwerke in Bleicherode and involved in this campaign.

On April 19, 1946, secret order No. 228ss was issued by the USSR Ministry of Aviation Industry under Mikhail Khrunichev concerning the details of relocating the German engine and aircraft industry, particularly the relocation of people and material.

Affected facilities 

 Arado Flugzeugwerke, Branch Brandenburg-Briest
 Askania Werke AG, Berlin-Friedenau
 BMW, Unseburg bei Staßfurt
 DVL, Berlin-Adlershof
 Junkers, Dessau
 Heinkel-Werke Oranienburg, Oranienburg
 Heinkel-Werke, Rostock
 Zentralwerke Bleicherode (Merger of Institut Rabe and Institut Nordhausen, and Montania AG, Nordhausen)
 Siebel Flugzeugwerke, Halle
 Siemens & Halske, Berlin
 Airplane-OKB from Halle
 Instrumentation-OKB from Berlin
 OKB for Engines from Dessau
 OKB for Engines from Unseburg
 OKB for Diesel from Dessau

Locations of stay in the USSR 

 Babuschkin near Moscow
 Yubileyny,
 Khimki, OKB-456
 Dserschinsk
 Gorodomlya Island – Island located on Lake Seliger, today Solnetschny, also referred to as Gorodomlya Branch of NII-88.
 Ilyinsky near Moscow
 Liskhimstroi, today Sievierodonetsk and the neighboring Town of Rubizhne located in Today's Ukraine
 Dubna, today Dubna 3, part of Dubna
 Podlipki, today Korolyov, sometimes referred to as Podlipki Branch of NII-88 Dokument CIA-RDP82-00457R007200170003-8
 Orekhovo-Zuyevo at the Klyazma River located in Moscow Oblast
 Sawjolowo, today part of Kimry located in Tver Oblast
 Tushino, north of Moscow
 Uprawlentschesk, today part of Samara short called Upra.
 Walentinowka
 Podberesje

Affected specialists (selection) 
In the following List, duration of stay in the USSR is stated, if known.

 Erich Apel, Linke-Hofmann-Werke, Breslau (until June 1952)
 Friedrich Asinger, Martin Luther University of Halle-Wittenberg (until 1954)
 Brunolf Baade, Junkers, Dessau (from October 1946 to 1954)
 Georg Backhaus, Junkers, Dessau
 Werner Baum, Peenemünde Army Research Center, Karlshagen
 Josef Blass, Arado Flugzeugwerke, Branch Brandenburg an der Havel
 , Deutsche Versuchsanstalt für Luftfahrt, Berlin-Adlershof (until 1954)
 Hans Ulrich Brancke, Junkers, Dessau (until June 1952)
 Ferdinand Brandner, Junkers, Dessau
 Helmut Breuninger, Askania Werke AG, Berlin-Friedenau (until February 1958)
 Werner Buschbeck (1900–1974), Telefunken (Head of Transmitter development), Berlin
 Rudolf Coermann, Deutsche Versuchsanstalt für Luftfahrt, Berlin-Adlershof (Telemetry Specialist) (until June 1952)
 Gerhard Cordes, Junkers, Dessau
 , Radarspezialist, Institut Berlin (until 1958)
 Norbert Elsner, TH Dresden, Dresden (until June 1952)
 , AEG-Kabelwerk Oberspree, Berlin-Oberschöneweide (until 1951)
 , Ernst-Orlich Institut, Danzig (until 1956)
 Hellmut Frieser, TH Dresden, Dresden (until June 1952)
 Karl-Hermann Geib, Leunawerke, Leuna
 Siegfried Günter, Heinkel-Werke Oranienburg, Oranienburg (until 1954)
 Helmut Gröttrup, Peenemünde Army Research Center, Karlshagen (until November 1953)
 Heinz Hartlepp, Askania Werke AG, Berlin
 , TH Dresden, Dresden, und Junkers, Dessau (until June 1954)
 Paul Herold, Leunawerke, Leuna
 Dr. Johannes (Hans) Hoch, University of Göttingen, Göttingen (Chief Designer - Guidance and Control) (Died 1955 in the USSR)
 Heinz Jaffke (Construction of Testing Facilities) (until June 1952)
 Alois Jasper, Mittelwerk GmbH (Final assembly) (until November 1953)
 , Telefunken and Askania Werke AG, Berlin (until February 1953)
 Kurt Kracheel, Ingenieurschule Gauß, Berlin
 Peter Lertes, Askania Werke AG, Berlin
 Kurt Magnus, University of Göttingen (until November 1953)
 , TH Dresden, Dresden (until June 1952)
 Fritz Preikschat, Gesellschaft für elektroakustische und mechanische Apparate (GEMA), Berlin-Köpenick (until June 1952)
 Karl Prestel, BMW, Unseburg bei Staßfurt
 Heinz Rössing, Siebel, Halle
 Alfred Scheibe, Junkers, Dessau
 Rudolf Scheinost, BMW, Staßfurt
 , Ernst Heinkel Flugzeugwerke, Rostock (until 1954)
 Werner Schulz, Peenemünde Army Research Center, Karlshagen (until June 1952)
 , Junkers, Dessau (until 1954)
 Willi Schwarz, Peenemünde Army Research Center, Karlshagen
 Heinrich Singer
 Karl Viktor Stahl (Specialist for starting procedures)
 Konrad Toebe, Arado Flugzeugwerke (Structural design of rockets, Statics)(until June 1952)
 Dr. Karl-Joachim Umpfenbach, Physikalisch-Technische Reichsanstalt, Berlin (Chief Designer - Propulsion) (until November 1953)
 Fritz Viebach, Peenemünde Army Research Center, Karlshagen (until November 1953)
 , DeTeWe Deutsche Telephonwerke und Kabelindustrie AG, Berlin (until June 1952)
 , Junkers, Dessau
 Kurt Wohlfahrt (until November 1953)
 Dr. Waldemar Wolff, Krupp, Essen (Chief Designer) (until June 1952)

Optical and glass industry 

While extensive literature regarding the aforementioned specialists exists,
this is not the case for the optics and glass specialists from Jena. 
The corresponding Soviet Order in dealing with the Carl-Zeiss-Works and the
Jenaer Glaswerk Schott & Gen. in Jena was dealt was secret order No. 186 of the
USSR Ministry of Armaments of July 16, 1946.

While research and development in the engine and aircraft industries were the focus
of Soviet interest, in Jena's optical and glass industries both R&D
and the construction of adequate production lines were also of importance to Soviet interest. 
In addition to the deportation of development personnel, this also resulted in the deportation
of production personnel to train Soviet specialists and the extensive deportation of production equipment.
This in turn meant that Jena was no longer able to pay the reparations demanded by the Soviet
side with the remaining means of production, which led to differences between the SMA of the
SBZ and Moscow. Ustinow originally intended to liquidate the Zeiss works,
which the Soviet side (paying reparations for) and the willingness of the Zeiss workforce to
rebuild did not allow for.

Even so, the Zeiss works were hit very hard by this action, as that they were looted by US troops in
the months after the end of the Second World War as part of the so-called Carl Zeiss works
mission and even more important parts of the works had been transferred to the American occupation zone.

Affected facilities 

 Carl Zeiss AG, Jena
 Jenaer Glaswerk Schott & Gen., Jena

Locations of stay in the USSR 

 Izium
 Leningrad, NII-380
 Lytkarino
 Moscow
 Novosibirsk
 Kyiv
 Krasnogorsk
 Kolomna
 Zagorsk, today Sergiyev Posad

Affected specialists (selection) 

 Horst Anschütz
 Oskar Bihlmeier
 Paul Gänswein
 Karl Gundlach
 Georg Günzerodt
 Prof.  (until 1952)
  (until 1953)
 , Friedrich-Schiller-Universität Jena, Jena (until 1953)
 Alfred Krohs
 Dr. Konrad Kühne
 Karl Linnemann
 Franz Peter
 Artur Pulz
 Willy Röger, Carl Zeiss Jena
 Herbet Schorch
 Wilhelm Friedrich Gottfried Schütz, Friedrich-Schiller-Universität Jena
 
 Harald Straubel
 Walter Süss
 Robert Tiedecken
 Fritz Winter
 Karl Papello, Carl Zeiss Jena (until 1952)

Other affected facilities (incomplete) 
Details as mentioned above are not known in this section.

 AEG-Kabelwerk Oberspree
 Hentschel, Staßfurt
 Filmfabrik Wolfen
 Farbfilmkopierwerk Sovexportfilm Berlin
 Telefunken, Berlin
 Wirkwarenfabrik Kötschen, Apolda
 Rheinmetall, Sömmerda
 Heavy Industry located in Chemnitz
 GEMA (Gesellschaft für elektroakustische und mechanische Apparate), Berlin-Köpenick
 Werke der IG Farbenindustrie AG: Leuna-Werke in Leuna, Buna-Werke in Schkopau, Farbenfabrik Wolfen, Elektrochemisches Kombinat Bitterfeld in Bitterfeld, Werke Ammendorf in Ammendorf, Werk Böhlen in Böhlen

Locations of stay in the USSR (selection) 
 Svema in Shostka, Ukrainian SSR, Filmfabrik Wolfen#After World War II
 Gorki
 Zheleznodorozhnaya

Affected specialists (selection) 
 , AEG-Kabelwerk Oberspree
 Paul Kotowski, Telefunken, AEG-Kabelwerk Oberspree
 , AEG-Kabelwerk Oberspree (until 1952)
 , Labor, Konstruktionsbüro und Versuchswerk Oberspree (LKVO) (until 1952)
 Alfred Rieche, I.G. Farben, Wolfen (until 1951)
 , Farbfilmkopierwerk Sovexportfilm Berlin (until 1950)
 , Technisches Projektbüro Berlin, Berlin-Schöneweide (until 1952)

Collection of contemporary press articles

Key recruits by Operation Osoaviakhim (incomplete list) 
 Hugo Schmeisser - arms designer, developed the first successful assault rifle, StG 44.
 Karl-Hermann Geib - physical chemist who, in 1943, developed the Girdler sulfide process which is regarded as the most cost-effective process for producing heavy water.
 Erich Apel - former rocket engineer at the Peenemünde Army Research Center, worked in the V-2 rocket program with Wernher von Braun.
 Helmut Gröttrup - engineer and rocket scientist, worked in the V-2 rocket program. Invented the smart card in 1967.
 Brunolf Baade - aeronautical engineer and former Nazi party member, led the development of the East German Baade 152, the first jet airliner to be developed in Germany.
 Ferdinand Brandner - aerospace designer and former  SS Standartenführer (colonel), played a major role in the development of the Kuznetsov NK-12 turboprop engine used on Tupolev Tu-95 bombers.
 Hans Wocke - airplane designer, former chief developer at Junkers Aircraft and Motor Works.
 Siegfried Günter - aircraft designer responsible for the world's first rocket-powered and turbojet airframes, father of the "thrust modulation theory".
 Friedrich Asinger - chemist and former Nazi party member well known for his development of a multi-component reaction, the Asinger reaction for the synthesis of 3-thiazolines.
 Alfred Rieche - chemist who discovered the Rieche formylation, a type of formylation reaction.
 Fritz Karl Preikschat - electrical and telecommunications engineer, invented an improved dot matrix printing teletypewriter.

See also
 Allied plans for German industry after World War II
 German influence on the Soviet space program
 Operation Paperclip, USA operation that  forcibly "recruited" German specialists

Other literature

References 

Germany–Soviet Union relations
Brain drain
Science and technology in the Soviet Union